Tupamari is a village in Kamrup rural district, situated in south bank of river Brahmaputra.

Transport
The village is near National Highway 37 and connected to nearby towns and cities with regular buses and other modes of transportation.

Demographics
According to 2011 census, the total population of Tupamari is 10,964. 51.2% of the population is male and 48.8% are female. There are 2,046 households. The literacy rate of the village is 51.25%. Most of the population is Muslim.

See also
 Ukiam
 Udiana
 Nagarbera

References

Villages in Kamrup district